San Javier Department may refer to:
 San Javier Department, Córdoba
 San Javier Department, Misiones
 San Javier Department, Santa Fe

See also
 San Javier (disambiguation)

Department name disambiguation pages